Yekyua or "mother animal" is a class of Yakut spirits that remain hidden until the snow melts in the Spring.

Each yekyua is associated with a particular animal, and they act as familiar spirits to protect the Yakut shaman.  They are dangerous and powerful. The most dangerous are attached to female shamans.  The type of animal manifestation also determines the strength of the yekyua.  For example, dog yekyua have very little power, while elk yekyua are quite powerful.  Only shaman can see the yekyua.  When a shaman puts his spirit into that of his yekyua, he or she is dependent on his animal part, in as much as if another shaman who has manifested his animal kills that of another, the shaman with the dead animal will himself die. When the yekyua are fighting in the spring, the shaman with which they are associated feel very ill.  The dog yekyua are not prized as they gnaw at the shaman and destroy his body, bringing him sickness.  Ordinarily, though, a good yekyua protects the shaman.

Notes

References
 Stutley, Margaret (2002) Shamanism: A Concise Introduction Routledge,  p. 55;
 Czaplicka, Marie Antoinette (1914) Aboriginal Siberia: A study in social anthropology Clarendon Press, Oxford, p. 20;

Yakut mythology
Siberian shamanism
Turkic legendary creatures